Beatrix Schröer (born 4 May 1963 in Meissen) is a German rower.

References 
 
 

1963 births
Living people
East German female rowers
People from Meissen
Olympic rowers of Germany
Rowers at the 1988 Summer Olympics
Olympic gold medalists for East Germany
Olympic medalists in rowing
Medalists at the 1988 Summer Olympics
World Rowing Championships medalists for East Germany
Sportspeople from Saxony